Taylor Farm may refer to:

in the United States
(by state)
Ridge Taylor Farm, Nicholasville, Kentucky, listed on the National Register of Historic Places in Jessamine County, Kentucky 
Taylor-Bray Farm, Yarmouth, Massachusetts, listed on the NRHP in Massachusetts 
 Taylor Farm (Richlands, North Carolina), listed on the National Register of Historic Places (NRHP) in North Carolina
Peter Taylor Farmstead, Newtown, Pennsylvania, listed on the National Register of Historic Places in Bucks County, Pennsylvania
 Taylor Farm (Richmond, Virginia), listed on the National Register of Historic Places in Richmond, Virginia

See also
Taylor Farms, company producing fruits and vegetables